Mun Young Choi (born March 19, 1964) is an American academic. He currently serves as Chancellor of the University of Missouri and President of the University of Missouri System. Prior to his appointment at Missouri he was Provost & Executive Vice President at the University of Connecticut.  He has also taught at Drexel University and the University of Illinois at Chicago. He lives in Columbia, Missouri.

Early life and education
Choi was born in Seoul, South Korea. Choi immigrated to the United States in 1973, settling in Akron, Ohio with his parents and three younger sisters at the age of nine. He attended Leggett Primary School in Akron, Ohio, and Trumbull Primary School in the Andersonville neighborhood and Boone Middle School in the West Rogers Park neighborhood of Chicago.  He graduated from Stephen Tyng Mather High School in Chicago in 1983.  He earned a BS degree (1987) in General Engineering from the University of Illinois at Urbana–Champaign and M.A. (1989) and Ph.D. (1992) degrees in Mechanical & Aerospace Engineering from Princeton University.

University of Missouri

On March 1, 2017, Choi became president of the four-campus University of Missouri System. On March 25, 2020, Choi agreed to serve as interim Chancellor of the University of Missouri flagship campus in Columbia (MU). This position was made permanent on July 28, making Choi the first to be both Chancellor of the University of Missouri in Columbia and President of the University of Missouri System simultaneously.

In the spring of 2020, students at MU petitioned Choi to remove a bronze statue of Thomas Jefferson, purchased and installed by MU alumni in 2001, from the University of Missouri's Francis Quadrangle. Choi instead proposed it be "recontextualized" with input from a task force. Choi subsequently rebuked reporters (who are also on the MU journalism faculty) for making what he called "inappropriate" social-media comments about Choi's refusal to remove the statue and characterized the comments as attempts to undermine the university. 

In July 2020, Choi and MU's provost fired the College of Education's dean, and when faced with criticism from some faculty, Choi reportedly demanded administrative support for this decision. This removal and its aftermath, along with his response regarding the Jefferson statue, has led to the criticism that Choi brooks no dissent. 

During the fall of 2020, some MU students said that Choi blocked them on Twitter after they expressed COVID-related health and safety concerns about conditions on campus. Examples of concerns relate to COVID-19 testing protocols and lack of running water in some campus bathrooms. MU alumnus Christopher Bennett threatened legal action on First Amendment grounds over Choi's blocking of student accounts. MU justified Choi's actions by stating that he "has been on the receiving end of messages/tweets that were disrespectful and not constructive [and] some contained profanity."

A faculty survey of Choi conducted in May 2022 found his performance "unsatisfactory", with the majority believing that Choi should not retain his position.

See also
History of the University of Missouri
Elmer Ellis, the only other person to lead both the University of Missouri and the University of Missouri System (not at the same time)

References

External links
Office of the President
Office of the Chancellor

1964 births
Living people
Academics from Missouri
American academic administrators
American academics of Korean descent
Drexel University faculty
Leaders of the University of Missouri
Mather High School alumni
People from Columbia, Missouri
Presidents of the University of Missouri System
Princeton University School of Engineering and Applied Science alumni
South Korean emigrants to the United States
University of Connecticut faculty
University of Illinois Chicago faculty
Grainger College of Engineering alumni